Kolucheh or Koleicha(also Romanized as Kwilîçe, also Romanized as Kolūcheh) is a village in Razavar Rural District, in the Central District of Kermanshah County, Kermanshah Province, Iran. At the 2006 census, its population was 400, in 81 families.

References 

Populated places in Kermanshah County